Hanford is an area in Stoke-on-Trent near to Trent Vale.

References

Areas of Stoke-on-Trent